Hostafrancs is a neighbourhood in the Sants-Montjuïc district of Barcelona, Catalonia, Spain. 

Originally the land of the neighbourhood belonged to the former municipality of Santa Maria de Sants, the current district. In 1839 the Provincial Council was to disassociate the sector was the Pont d'en Rabassa Cross to cover for him in Barcelona.

The Hostafrancs metro station, on Barcelona Metro line L1, is located in the middle of the neighbourhood. The Plaça d'Espanya, along with the Espanya metro and railway station, lies on the eastern edge of the neighbourhood. Barcelona's main Sants railway station is just outside the neighbourhood, to the north.

References

Neighbourhoods of Barcelona
Sants-Montjuïc